A spiff, or spiv, is slang for an immediate bonus for a sale.  Typically, spiffs are paid, either by a manufacturer or employer, directly to a salesperson for selling a specific product.  It is sometimes given as SPIF or SPIFF, a backronym, with invented words to fit the letters, but these are not the origin (see below).

Origin
An early reference to a spiff can be found in a slang dictionary of 1859; "The percentage allowed by drapers to their young men when they effect sale of old fashioned or undesirable stock."  An article in the Pall Mall Gazette of 1890 on the practices in London shops uses the term:
a "spiff" system is usually adopted, spiffs being premiums placed on certain articles, not of the last fashion, indicated by a marvelous hieroglyphic put on the price ticket.  These marks are well known by the assistant, and the almost invisible mystic sign explains why an article, wholly unsuitable, is foisted on the jaded customer as "just the thing."
The Oxford English Dictionary suggests that (apart from a corruption of specific) it could be connected with the use of the word in that period to mean a dandy or somebody smartly dressed (hence spiffy, and to spiff up - to improve the appearance of a place or a person), but nobody seems to have been able to disentangle the threads of which came first, or what influenced what, or where the word originally came from.

Practice
In 1936 Rex Stout used the word in Nero Wolfe's "The Red Box" (Chapter 3): "He stopped, smiling from Wolfe to me and back again like a haberdasher's clerk trying to sell an old number with a big spiff on it." 

In 1947 it was reported that spiffs were prizes given to employees who sold particularly high amounts of electrical goods.

In 2019, Dell EMC use the term SPIF (Sales Performance Incentive Fund) to refer to programs designed to target business that might otherwise go to competitors.

References

Further reading
Andris A. Zoltners, Prabhakant Sinha, Sally E. Lorimer (2008) The Complete Guide to Sales Force Incentive Compensation, Amazon 
F. Caldierero & A. T. Coughlan (2007) Marketing Science 26 (1) pp 31–51 "Spiffed-up channels: The role of spiffs in hierarchical selling organizations"
CCI eBook, "Executing a Successful SPIF: Best Practices, Tips, and Techniques"]

Employment compensation